Afrochroa lepida is a species of beetles in the family Buprestidae, the only species in the genus Afrochroa.

References

Monotypic Buprestidae genera